The Yangon General Hospital (YGH) is a major public hospital in a  compound in Yangon, Myanmar. The 2,000-bed hospital consists of seven medical wards, three surgical wards, two trauma and orthopaedic wards, and 28 specialist departments for inpatient care. The hospital also runs an ER for general medicine, general surgery and traumatology.

History

Early history 
In the early 1890s, the Agri-Horticultural Gardens and the Phayre Museum occupied the present site of Yangon General Hospital. 

The Yangon General Hospital was established in 1899 as the Rangoon General Hospital (RGH).

The main building was designed by the head of the Public Works Department, Henry Hoyne-Fox, and construction started in 1904 and took five years to complete. It was fitted with all the latest modern medical improvement at that time, including operating theatres with electricity and anesthesia rooms. The 3-story Victorian-style main building was opened on 6 May 1905. 

In the following year, the administrative block and other structures, such as the Matron's accommodation and the morgue, were added and cost four million rupees overall. In 1911, the new and larger hospital opened its doors for the first time with a total of 342 beds. It also housed the country's first bacteriological laboratory, through which several contributions to global medical science were made during the early 20th century.

World War II 
During the Japanese Occupation, the Imperial Japanese Army occupied the buildings and reserved them for Japanese personnel; the General Hospital had to temporarily relocate to the former Diocesan Girls’ School on Signal Pagoda Road.

After World War II 
After World War II, the hospital underwent renovations and had a capacity of 546 beds. In 1964, new specialist wards were added, and the capacity was increased to 1500 beds.

The building was a major massacre site during the 8888 Uprising, in which injured patients, assumed to have taken part in the anti-government protests, were killed by the Tatmadaw. The hospital is closed to tourists. The hospital was also the site of Aung San Suu Kyi's first public speech, on 24 August 1988. The hospital was listed on the Yangon City Heritage List in 2017.

Services and specialties provided 
The hospital has around 2000 staff. As of July 2018,  the hospital has 2000 beds and generally treats 1800 inpatients and between 800 and 1200 outpatients a day.

Although public health care is nominally free, patients do have to pay for some medicine that is not provided by the Ministry of Health.

Departments 
YGH maintains both medical and surgical specialist departments and diagnostic departments.

Specialist departments

 Department of Cardiovascular Medicine (Ward 20)
 Department of Cardiovascular Surgery (Ward 19)
 Department of Clinical Haematology
 Department of Dermatology
 Department of Diabetes and Endocrinology (Ward 15+16)(Attached with General Medical Unit 2B (Ward 13+14))
 Department of Emergency Medicine
 Department of Anaesthesiology and Intensive Care Medicine
 Department of Hand and Reconstructive Microsurgery (Ward (3+4))
 Department of Neurology
 Department of Neurosurgery
 Department of Gastroenterology
 Department of Geriatrics (Ward 9+10)(Attached with General Medical Unit 3B (Ward 7+8))
 Department of Medical Oncology
 Department of Plastic, Maxillofacial & Oral Surgery
 Department of Physical Medicine & Rehabilitation
 Department of Radiation Oncology
 Department of Tropical and Infectious Diseases (Attached with General Medical Unit 1B)
 General Medical Units (1A, 2A (Ward 17+18), 3A (Ward 11+12)& 4)
 General Surgical Units (1, 2 & 3)
 Trauma care units (1 (Ward 1+2) & 2 (Ward 5+6))
 Intensive Care Cardiovascular Unit (Cardiac Intensive Care Unit and Coronary Care Unit (CCU)) (Ward 20)
 Diagnostic and Therapeutic Cardiovasular Catheterisation Laboratories 
 Operation Theatre Complex 
 Arrhythmias Clinic
 Special Skin Clinic
 STD Clinic 
 National TB Programme 
 Diabetic Clinic 
 Dentistry Clinic
 Mental Health Clinic 
 Acute Burn Care Unit
 Epilepsy Unit
 Isolation Ward
 Pain and Palliative Care Unit

Diagnostics departments

 Department of Radiology (MRI, 24 hr CT scan service, Xray, USS)
 Department of Pathology
 Department of Microbiology
 Department of Nuclear Medicine
 Diagnostic Cardiovascular Catheterisation Laboratories
 Non-invasive Cardiovascular Diagnostic Lab
 National Endoscopy Centre
 Neuroelectrophyisological Centre

Auxiliary departments

 Department of Forensic Medicine
 National Blood Bank
 Medical Record Department
 Bio-Medical Engineering Department
 Kitchen
 Laundry
 Motor Transport

Clinical training and nursing education 
YGH is the Tertiary Care Teaching Hospital of University of Medicine 1, Yangon, the Yangon Institute of Nursing, and the University of Medical Technology, Yangon. In particular, it is the main teaching hospital of the University of Medicine 1, Yangon.

Research and other medical and academic collaborations 
 Australia–Myanmar Trauma Management Program: From 2015 to 2017, this program gave trauma care team training to Myanmar clinicians.

See also 
 List of hospitals in Yangon

References

Hospital buildings completed in 1899
Hospitals in Yangon
Hospitals established in 1899
1899 establishments in Burma